La Sarre Airport  is located  northeast of La Sarre, Quebec, Canada.

References

Registered aerodromes in Abitibi-Témiscamingue